Kojatice may refer to:

  Kojatice, Prešov District, village in Prešov District, Slovakia
  Kojatice (Třebíč District), village in Třebíč District, Czech Republic